Mirrus is a technology firm that developed the first digital advertising mirror that is controlled remotely.  The mirror can record and report the exact number and duration of consumer engagements in real time.

Mirrus was founded in 2006 by Brian Reid.

History
In 2006 Reid founded LuxuryTec LLC to create unique brand assets for Fortune 500 companies. LuxuryTec focused on Fabric HD and mirror technology. With the release and emergence of its proprietary mirror technology, LuxuryTec LLC began doing business under the name Mirrus.

Fabric HD

LuxuryTec began the Fabric HD business by manufacturing custom life jackets and boat fender covers for Chris Craft. LuxuryTec then began working with entertainment venues and event production companies to use this technology

LuxuryTec created SeatTux, a custom fitting fabric seat cover with corporate logos, messages. This product enabled brands to communicate to the fans in attendance along with a television audience.

Mirror Technology

Televisions displayed behind two-way mirror glass had been available for roughly 15 years but had been isolated to the hospitality and residential markets. 

Mirrus developed a mirror technology in which video ads can be scheduled and sent via the Internet to a specific mirror anywhere in the world. The Mirror Technology displays high definition video ads until a consumer approaches or engages the unit. Once engaged, the video or ad playing in the unit migrates and continues to play in the corner of the unit while the remainder screen instantly becomes a fully functioning mirror. As the consumer walks away from the mirror the video advertisement reverts to full size, until approached by the next consumer.

By integrating a motion sensor to detect consumer engagement, the mirror technology can utilize this function to record and report the length of time a consumer engaged with a mirror, the location of that mirror, how long the consumer was engaged, and what video ad or ads were playing during their engagement. Mirrus provides a detailed report of consumer engagement to brands and advertisers.

Partnerships

Sports arenas and stadiums

Mirrus partnered with ISP Sports in August 2010 to install the mirror technology in the bathrooms of  Virginia Tech's Lane Stadium, Georgia Tech's Bobby Dodd Stadium and East Carolina's Dowdy-Ficklen stadium.

Mirrus also installed its mirrors in the American Airlines Center in Dallas.

Airports
The company partnered with Clear Channel Airports and installed 150 mirrors in Chicago's O’Hare International Airport in October 2010.

Beauty and retail venues

Mirrus' technology was on display at Sephora's Sensorium event in New York in October 2011. 

Paul Mitchell Schools in Texas, Chicago, and Charlotte installed Mirrus mirrors in 2011.

References

External links
 Mirrus

Technology companies of the United States